Vansickle is a dispersed rural community and unincorporated place in the municipality of Havelock-Belmont-Methuen, Peterborough County in Central Ontario, Canada. It lies just west of the Crowe River on the border with the township of Marmora and Lake in Hastings County.

References

Communities in Peterborough County